The Canadian Radio Music Awards is an annual series of awards presented by the Canadian Association of Broadcasters that was part of Canadian Music Week. The award show began in 1998.

2016
Complete list of 2016 Canadian Radio Music Awards winners

2017
Complete list of 2017 Canadian Radio Music Awards winners

2018
Complete list of 2018 Canadian Radio Music Awards winners

References

External links
CRMA Awards at Canadian Music Week

Canadian music awards